The Moreno Formation is a Mesozoic geologic formation located in San Joaquin Valley (California).Dinosaur remains diagnostic to the genus level are among the fossils that have been recovered from the formation.

Paleofauna

Ray-finned fish

Dinosaurs

Mosasaurs

Plesiosaurs

Turtles

See also

 List of dinosaur-bearing rock formations
 List of stratigraphic units with few dinosaur genera

Footnotes

References
 Hilton, Richard P. 2003. Dinosaurs and Other Mesozoic Reptiles of California. Berkeley: University of California Press. 318 pp.
 Weishampel, David B.; Dodson, Peter; and Osmólska, Halszka (eds.): The Dinosauria, 2nd, Berkeley: University of California Press. 861 pp. .

Maastrichtian Stage of North America
Cretaceous California